Əliqasımlı (also, Alikasumly and Alikasymly) is a village and municipality in the Jalilabad Rayon of Azerbaijan.  It has a population of 2,533.

Notable natives 
 
 Arif Gubadov — National Hero of Azerbaijan.

References 

Populated places in Jalilabad District (Azerbaijan)